Marion Mildred Halligan AM (born 1940) is an Australian writer and novelist. She was born and educated in Newcastle, New South Wales, and worked as a school teacher and journalist before publishing her first short stories. Halligan has served as chairperson of the Literature Board of the Australia Council and the Australian National Word Festival. She currently lives in Canberra.

For a number of years she was a member of a group of women writers based in Canberra known as the "Canberra Seven" or "Seven Writers". The group began with three members in 1980, growing to seven by 1984. In addition to Marion Halligan, they were Dorothy Johnston, Margaret Barbalet, Sara Dowse, Suzanne Edgar, Marian Eldridge and Dorothy Horsfield. The group essentially disbanded after Marian Eldridge's death in 1997. However, before that they met regularly to critique each other's work, and published a book of short stories called Canberra Tales in 1988.

She was appointed Member of the Order of Australia (AM), General Division, in 2006 for services to literature and for her work in promoting Australian literature.

Awards

 1990 — Pascall Prize winner for Eat My Words 
 1990 — NBC Banjo Award shortlisted for The Spider Cup
 1992 — The Age Book of the Year Imaginative Writing Prize 1992 winner for Lovers' Knots: A Hundred-Year Novel
 1992 — The Age Book of the Year Book of the Year 1992 joint winner for Lovers' Knots: A Hundred-Year Novel
 1993 — NBC Banjo Award shortlisted for Lovers' Knots: A Hundred-Year Novel
 1994 — Nita Kibble Literary Award winner for Lovers' Knots: A Hundred-Year Novel
 1994 — ACT Book of the Year joint winner for Lovers' Knots: A Hundred-Year Novel 
 1998 — The Age Book of the Year Fiction Prize shortlisted for The Golden Dress
 1999 — The Miles Franklin Award shortlisted for The Golden Dress
 2002 — Nita Kibble Literary Award shortlisted for The Fog Garden
 2004 — Commonwealth Writers' Prize South East Asia and South Pacific Region, Best Book shortlisted for The Point
 2004 — ACT Book of the Year winner for The Point
 2010 — ACT Book of the Year winner for Valley of Grace

Bibliography

Novels

 Self Possession (1987)
 Spider Cup (1990)
 Lovers' Knots: A Hundred-Year Novel (1992)
 Wishbone (1994)
 The Golden Dress (1998)
 The Fog Garden (2001)
 The Point (2003)
 The Apricot Colonel (2006)
 Murder on the Apricot Coast (2008)
 Valley of Grace (2009)
 Goodbye Sweetheart (2015)
 Words for Lucy (2022)

Short story collections

 The Living Hothouse (1988)
 The Hanged Man in the Garden (1989)
 The Worry Box (1993)
 Collected Stories (1997)
 Shooting the Fox (2011)

Non-fiction

 Eat My Words (1990)
 Out of the Picture (1996) - collection
 Cockles of the Heart (1996) - travel
 Those Women Who Go To Hotels (1997) - autobiography, travel
 The Taste of Memory (2004)

Contributed works 
 "Most mortal enemy", "Belladonna gardens", and "Perilous seas" published in Canberra Tales: Stories (1988). "Belladonna gardens" had previously been published in Meanjin, "Perilous seas" in Fiction '88, edited by Frank Moorhouse, ABC Publications.

Edited

 The Gift of Story: Three Decades of UQP Short Stories (1998)
 Storykeepers (2001)

Children's

 The Midwife's Daughters (1997)

Critical studies and reviews of Halligan's work
 Review of Shooting the fox.

References

1940 births
Living people
Australian children's writers
Australian women novelists
People from Canberra
Writers from the Australian Capital Territory
Members of the Order of Australia
20th-century Australian novelists
21st-century Australian novelists
20th-century Australian women writers
21st-century Australian women writers
Australian women short story writers
Australian women children's writers
20th-century Australian short story writers
21st-century Australian short story writers